CHMS-FM is a Canadian radio station broadcasting at 97.7 FM in Bancroft, Ontario. The station airs a classic Hits format using the on-air branding 97.7 Moose FM, and is owned by Vista Broadcast Group.

The station originally began broadcasting as CJNH in 1975, on the AM band at 1240 kHz and partially rebroadcasting CJBQ in Belleville, and CJTN in Trenton, to the south. CJNH was given approval by the CRTC on March 2, 2001 to convert to FM, and moved to the FM band at 97.7 FM in May 2001 with the new callsign CHMS-FM.

On April 23, 2012 Vista Broadcast Group, which owns a number of radio stations in western Canada, announced a deal to acquire Haliburton Broadcasting Group, in cooperation with Westerkirk Capital. The transaction was approved by the CRTC on October 19, 2012.

The station later became a classic hits as 97.7 Moose FM.

References

External links
 97.7 Moose FM
 
 

Hms
Hms
Hms
Hms
Radio stations established in 1975
1975 establishments in Ontario